Dirk Helbing (born January 19, 1965) is Professor of Computational Social Science at the Department of Humanities, Social and Political Sciences and affiliate of the Computer Science Department at ETH Zurich.

Biography 

Dirk Helbing studied physics and mathematics at the University of Göttingen. He completed his doctoral thesis at Stuttgart University, on modeling social processes by means of game-theoretical approaches, stochastic methods, and complex systems theory. In 1996, he completed further studies on traffic dynamics and optimization.

In 2000, he became a full professor and Managing Director of the Institute for Transport and Economics at Dresden University of Technology. Helbing was elected as a member of the German Academy of Sciences Leopoldina in 2008 and of the World Academy of Art and Science in 2016. In January 2014 Prof. Helbing received an honorary PhD from Delft University of Technology (TU Delft). Since June 2015 he is affiliate professor at the faculty of Technology, Policy and Management at TU Delft, where he leads the PhD school in "Engineering Social Technologies for a Responsible Digital Future".

Research activities 

Dirk Helbing started out as a physicist. His diploma thesis focussed on pedestrian, crowd, and evacuation modeling and simulation. During his PhD and habilitation in physics, he helped to establish the fields of socio-, econo- and traffic physics. He was also co-founder of the Physics of Socio-Economic Systems Division of the German Physical Society (DPG). As a visiting scientist at Tel Aviv University and the Weizmann Institute in Israel, the Eötvös University in Budapest, and Xerox PARC in California, he focused on a broad variety of complex systems - including the self-organisation of pedestrians, traffic jams, bacterial patterns, and Mexican waves. At Dresden University of Technology he became the Managing Director of the Institute of Transport & Economics, worked on traffic assistant systems (i.e. early self-driving cars) and a self-organized traffic light control system, which was patented. He found that crowd disasters are caused by a phenomenon called "crowd turbulence" and worked on ways to describe, reduce and respond to such disasters. As professor of Sociology at ETH Zurich, he worked on evolutionary game theory and agent-based computer simulations of social processes and phenomena.

The work of Prof. Helbing has been widely cited in the media and academia and he has written more than 10 papers in Nature, Science and PNAS. In 2012, he won the Idee Suisse Award. He co-founded the Competence Center for Coping with Crises in Complex Socio-Economic Systems, the Risk Center, the Institute for Science, Technology and Policy (ISTP) and the Decision Science Laboratory (DeSciL). While coordinating the FuturICT initiative, he helped to further develop disciplines such as data science, computational social science, and global systems science in Europe. This work resulted in the establishment of the Nervousnet Platform, a smartphone app enabling users to share data to be used to achieve scientific and social goals and lay the groundwork for digital democracy. Helbing worked for the World Economic Forum’s Global Agenda Council on Complex Systems. He was elected member of the External Faculty of the Santa Fe Institute and now belongs to the External Faculty of the Complexity Science Hub Vienna. He sits in the Boards of the Global Brain Institute in Brussels and the International Centre for Earth Simulation in Geneva. He is also involved in the activities of "Staatslabor" (a Swiss government science initiative) as well as the establishment of the Blockchain [X] initiative and the Blockchain Lab in Delft. He is a member of a Swiss governmental advisory group on the societal impact of digitization and was lead author of a "Digital Manifesto" on how to safeguard democratic values in the digital age. Prof. Helbing is an adviser to the Citizen Science Center Zurich  and is an advocate of a European Charter of Digital Human Rights.

Dirk Helbing is known for the social force model, in particular its application to self-organising phenomena in pedestrian crowds. Besides the slower-is-faster effect, he introduced the freezing-by-heating effect  and the phase diagram of congested traffic states. Helbing also proposed a microscopic foundation of evolutionary game theory and has studied self-organized behavioral conventions. His work has applied the principles of collective intelligence and self-organized control to the optimization of urban  and freeway traffic. He has conducted research into norms and conflict, and the role of success-driven motion for the establishment of cooperation among selfish individuals, socio-inspired technology and techno-social systems, the spread of disaster  and crisis management.

Living Earth Simulator

Helbing was the Principal Investigator on a project named FuturICT Knowledge Accelerator and Crisis Relief System, a computing system working on big datasets, conceived as sort of a crystal ball of the world. The core of the system is the Living Earth Simulator, a computing machine attempting "to model global-scale systems — economies, governments, cultural trends, epidemics, agriculture, technological developments, and more — using torrential data streams, sophisticated algorithms, and as much hardware as it takes". However, the project lost in the final round of the application for funding from the European Commission of €1 billion. Despite this, the ideas developed by the group have influenced international research programs. Since 2017, the FuturICT 2.0 project is being funded by the European Commission's FLAG-ERA program.

Noteworthy projects and presentations by Dirk Helbing's research teams in Dresden, Zurich and Delft 

 Derivation of the replicator equation in evolutionary game theory and of the self-organization of behavioral conventions from behavioral imitation.
 Creation of an electronic traffic assistance system to reduce traffic jams on freeways (an early algorithm for self-driving cars).
 Invention of a patented self-organized traffic light control system for cities.
 Semiconductor logistic project with Infineon Technologies increasing throughput by 30%.
 Development of the "social force model", frequently used for pedestrian and crowd simulation.
 Establishment of an expert team to improve the safety of pilgrimages.
 Data-based agent-based simulation study on the Middle Eastern conflict in Jerusalem.
 Publication "How to save human lives: What complexity science and information systems can contribute". 
 Patent: "Interaction Support Processor" - Ethically aligned design for information systems. 
 Nervousnet App - the Internet of Things as a Citizen Web (in development).
 Grippenet App for anonymous cooperative health monitoring (in development).
 Speech at the Out of the Box Conference with World Thinkers and the Dalai Lama on May 16, 2012. 
 Declaration of "Digital Democracy" at the Falling Walls Conference in Berlin on November 9, 2015.
 Talk at the "Build Peace" Conference in Zurich on September 11, 2016: "A New Paradigm for World Peace Is Possible".
 BIOTS - Blockchain and Internet of Things School at ETH Zurich, founded in 2016.
 Co-founded Zurich Hub for Ethics and Technology in (2016). 
 Article in Nature, "Sustainable development: Turn war rooms into peace rooms", Dirk Helbing and Peter Seele, September 28, 2017.
 Interview at "Petersberger Gespräche" 2017 (Bonn, German) on September 16, 2017: "Artificial Intelligence - from feasibility and superintelligence to planning and envisioning the future".

Controversies

Allegations of Inappropriate Presentation Content 
In February 2022, during a lecture Professor Dirk Helbing presented a slide that some students from ETH Zurich considered inappropriate and insensitive to the Chinese community. Consequently the students reached out to Professor Helbing to raise their concerns The students also raised theirs concerns to the ETH Zurich Ombudsman and Respect Advice Center that provides services related to inappropriate behaviours, discrimination, bullying or allegations at the Institute. A group of Chinese Students also wrote open letters to ETH Zurich to address this issue.

Social Media Comments and Death Threats 
This allegations by the students was mentioned on LinkedIn and received a lot of comments from students and researchers worldwide. In addition it was mentioned that Professor Dirk Helbing received some comments that was perceived as Death Threats.

Investigation and Closure 
Following an investigation and discussion with the ETH Zurich Ombudsman and Respect Advice center, Professor Dirk Helbing presented an apology statement on Twitter and LinkedIn Accounts. The ETH Zurich Twitter account also mentioned about the apology from Professor Dirk Helbing to the satisfaction of the students and close the issue.

Footnotes

External links 

 Homepage of ETH Zurich's Chair of Sociology, in particular of Modeling and Simulation (SOMS)
 Publication list of Dirk Helbing
 Selected papers in Game Theory and Traffic Theory
 Scientific videos and animations
 Living Science project

Academic staff of ETH Zurich
Computational social scientists
Complex systems scientists
University of Göttingen alumni
1965 births
Living people
People from Aalen
Network scientists